Taxoid 7beta-hydroxylase is an enzyme with systematic name taxusin,NADPH:oxygen 7-oxidoreductase. This enzyme catalyses the following chemical reaction

 taxusin + O2 + NADPH + H+  7beta-hydroxytaxusin + NADP+ + H2O

Taxoid 7beta-hydroxylase requires cytochrome P450.

References

External links 
 

EC 1.14.13